Hongokuchō or more formally Nihonbashi Hongokuchō is a neighborhood of Nihonbashi, Chuo-ku, Tokyo. It is the location of the Bank of Japan.

Education
Public elementary and junior high schools are operated by Chuo City Board of Education.

Hongokucho is zoned to Tokiwa Elementary School (中央区立常盤小学校) and Nihonbashi Junior High School (日本橋中学校).

References

Nihonbashi, Tokyo
Chūō, Tokyo
Neighborhoods of Tokyo